Clypecaris is genus of bivalved Cambrian arthropod known from the Chengjiang biota of Yunnan, China. The genus was initially described for the type species C. pteroidea by Hou, 1999. A second species C. serrata was described by Yang et al. in 2016. The species are primarily distinguished by the presence of a serrated edge on the front of the carapace of C. serrata. C. serrata is noted for the modification of an anterior pair of limbs into spined grasping appendages, indicating a predatory lifestyle. It is unknown whether a similar structure was present in C. pteroidea. Clypecaris is considered to likely be a member or a close relative of Hymenocarina, and is closely related to Perspicaris. As well as to Ercaicunia.

See also

 Arthropod
 Cambrian explosion
 Chengjiang biota
 List of Chengjiang Biota species by phylum

References

Cambrian animals
Maotianshan shales fossils
Prehistoric arthropod genera
Cambrian genus extinctions

Hymenocarina